Somerset County Cricket Club is one of eighteen first-class county clubs within the domestic cricket structure of England and Wales. It represents the historic county of Somerset. Founded in 1875, Somerset was initially regarded as a minor county until official first-class status was acquired in 1895. Somerset has competed in the County Championship since 1891 and has subsequently played in every top-level domestic cricket competition in England. The club's limited overs team was formerly named the Somerset Sabres, but is now known only as Somerset.

Somerset's early history is complicated by arguments about its status. It is generally regarded as a minor county from its foundation in 1875 until 1890, apart from the 1882 to 1885 seasons when it is considered by substantial sources to have been an unofficial first-class team, holding important match status. There are, however, two matches involving W. G. Grace in 1879 and 1881 which are considered first-class by some authorities. In 1891, Somerset joined the County Championship, which had just become an officially recognised competition, and has important match status from 1891 to 1894. The county is classified as an official first-class team from 1895 by Marylebone Cricket Club (MCC) and the County Championship clubs; classified as a List A team since the beginning of limited overs cricket in 1963; and classified as a senior Twenty20 team since 2003.

Somerset have never won the County Championship, their highest finish being second, which they achieved in 2001, 2010, 2012, 2016, 2018 and 2019. The club won their first silverware in the late 1970s, winning both the Gillette Cup and John Player League in 1979. In the years since, Somerset have experienced some success in one-day cricket, winning the Gillette Cup on two further occasions, the Benson & Hedges Cup twice and the John Player League once more. The team has reached the final of the Twenty20 cup competition on five occasions, winning it in 2005. They won the 2019 Royal London One-Day Cup, their first since emerging victorious in the 2001 edition.

The club has its headquarters at the County Ground, Taunton, where in the present-day almost all of its games are played. Since 2005, Somerset also play at Taunton Vale against MCC Universities teams (including first-class matches in 2012 and 2015); Taunton Vale is also the regular home venue for the Second XI team. The club have played at a number of other grounds in their past, with a significant number of matches at Clarence Park (until 1996), Weston-super-Mare and the Recreation Ground, Bath (until 2011).

Honours

First XI honours
 One-Day Cup (4)  – 1979, 1983, 2001, 2019
 National League (1) – 1979
 Benson & Hedges Cup (2) – 1981, 1982
 Twenty20 Cup (1) – 2005

Second XI honours
 Minor Counties Championship (2) – 1961, 1965
 Second XI Championship (2) – 1994, 2004

History

Earliest cricket in Somerset
In the seventeenth century, the related sport of "Stow-Ball", or "Stob-Ball" was being played in north Somerset, as in neighbouring Gloucestershire and Wiltshire, as well as parts of Dorset. This sport most likely used either the base of a tree or its remaining stump as its wicket, as both 'stow' and 'stob' are dialect words for 'stump'. However, 'stow' could also refer to a frame used to support crawling tunnels in mines such as those lead mines in north Somerset, providing another possibility for the wicket. The ball was made of a leather case, stuffed with boiled quills, and was four inches in diameter, roughly the same size as a modern softball, while the bats, known as 'staves' were shaped similarly to a field hockey stick and typically made of withy or willow.

The earliest confirmed reference to cricket in Somerset is a match on 13 July 1751 that was played in memory of the late Frederick, Prince of Wales who was a noted patron of the sport. The first officially organised club to be recognised in Somerset was Lansdown Cricket Club, formed in 1825, although a Bath cricket club seems to have preceded it with a similar collection of enthusiasts from around 1817–1824. With a limited number of other organised clubs to play, fixtures were few and far apart in the founding years, with matches being played against Clifton, Sidmouth and Teignmouth. Lansdown placed Somerset in the cricketing world, and played a number of matches against 'England XI' in various forms.

In 1865, the first attempt at a county side was made with the formation of Yeovil and County Cricket Club. They performed poorly in their opening matches against local club sides, and on one occasion, even lost three players to their opposition the day before the match was scheduled to begin. In spite of these problems, they did play a 'county' fixture, against the Gentlemen of Devon; the match was abandoned due to rain. The first recorded occasion of a Gentlemen of Somerset side playing comes five years previously however, when a Somerset side travelled down to Culm Vale to take on the Gentlemen of Devon, this match also resulting in a draw.

Origin of club
The formation of Somerset County Cricket Club was decided in 1875 after the playing of one such match between the Gentlemen of Somerset and the Gentlemen of Devon at Sidmouth in Devon. Having played a two-day match, which the Somerset team won by eight wickets, the Gentlemen of Somerset and their friends held a meeting and resolved the Somerset should have its own county cricket club. Somerset is the only one of the present first-class counties in English cricket whose county cricket club was founded outside the boundaries of the traditional county. After their resolution, the gentlemen continued playing games under the name Gentlemen of Somerset, but their fixtures became more regular; rather than occasional games against the Gentlemen of Devon, they played host to teams from Dorset and Devon in 1876, and in 1877 visited Dorset, Worcestershire, Warwickshire and Wiltshire in addition to their trip to Devon.

The following 1878 season, two matches were played by a Somerset team; a two-day match against Hertfordshire played at St Albans finished in a draw, while Worcestershire were beaten by an innings and 47 runs later in the month at Bath. In 1879, Somerset played nine matches, albeit one of them against a Wells team. During these early seasons, Somerset were never far from insolvency. An initial letter sent out after the formation of the club had only managed to raise £70 17s, while gate receipts in the first season raised the club £1 15s 8d. Despite this, fixtures continued to be arranged, and the amateurs kept on playing; bringing their own kit and paying for their own tickets for travel to away matches.

There are alternative versions of when Somerset's first first-class match took place, and matches in 1879 and 1881 are central to the statistics of W. G. Grace – see the article on Variations in first-class cricket statistics. If those games are discounted, then Somerset CCC played its initial first-class match against Lancashire CCC at Old Trafford on 8, 9 and 10 June 1882 and joined the (then unofficial) County Championship. This first-class status lasted for only four seasons: after the 1885 season, Somerset failed to arrange sufficient fixtures with the other first-class teams to be accorded first-class status.

In 1890, following a successful recruitment policy at universities by the club's first full-time secretary, Henry Murray-Anderdon, Somerset played 13 games, including 2 against Middlesex, winning 12 of them and tying the other against Middlesex, furthering their ambition to be a first-class county.

At the third annual meeting of The County Cricket Council on 9 December 1889 the counties decided to create a sub-committee to consider whether an official classification of the counties should exist and how counties might rise from one class to another. Somerset was one of the 6 counties represented on the committee. The committee met on 11 August 1890 and proposed three classes of counties. The existing 8 first-class counties would remain with Somerset one of 8 second-class counties proposed. A system of promotion and relegation was suggested. These proposals was debated at the fourth annual meeting of The County Cricket Council on 8 December 1890. They were not well received. Eventually a vote was taken on whether The County Cricket Council itself should be suspended sine die. The motion was passed on the casting vote of the Chairman and The County Cricket Council effectively ceased to exist. "This utterly unexpected result fairly took those present by surprise, and they dispersed hurriedly – a most undignified ending to what we are compelled to describe as a most unbusinesslike meeting." Mr. H.T. Hewett and Mr. T. Spencer were present for Somerset. On the following day, 9 December 1890, the county secretaries met to decide the fixtures for 1891, which they did on the usual basis of arranging "home and home" matches against whichever counties they wished. "The most noticeable feature ... is the encouragement given to Somersetshire by the chief county clubs. Middlesex played the western shire last summer, but Kent, Surrey, Yorkshire, Gloucestershire and Lancashire will next summer test the merits of the eleven, which showed such good all round cricket, under Mr. H.T. Hewett's command, last year." By arranging these 12 matches against first-class counties Somerset became a de facto first-class county without any proposal or vote to that effect. Hewett, Spencer and Mr. W.N. Roe were present for Somerset.

Pre-First World War

In Somerset's second season, 1892, they finished third, but it was to be 66 years before they finished as high again. Until the Great Depression, the team regularly comprised a number of more or less talented amateurs and just a handful of professionals. They enjoyed over many decades a reputation for cheerful inconsistency, highlighted by three wins over an all-conquering Yorkshire side in 1901 and 1902, when they did not lose to any other county.

Famous names from the pre-First World War period included the England players Sammy Woods, Lionel Palairet and Len Braund; the fast bowler Tom Richardson also played for the county once after his retirement from Surrey. In 1908, Woods persuaded the England rugby union international John Daniell to become captain with the team struggling financially, and Daniell stayed, mostly playing as captain and often acting as secretary too, for almost 20 years. However, in the immediate period before World War I, with the loss of the key amateurs who promoted the club to first-class status and financial difficulties forcing the club to dis-engage most of its few professionals, Somerset finished last four times in six years and lost fifteen and drew three of eighteen games in 1910.

Between the wars
In the first season of the County Championship after the First World War, 1919, Somerset finished fifth in the table, the highest since 1892. But that was the highest position in the inter-war years, and mostly the side finished at or below halfway down the table, though there were no more bottom places in this period.

The team continued to be a mix of a few highly talented amateurs and a few good professionals, with the side often made up with amateur players who appeared in only a few games. Among the amateurs, the west Somerset farmer Jack White, who succeeded Daniell as captain in 1927, played for England as a left-arm orthodox spinning all-rounder and also captained the Test side in Australia in 1928–29. The briefest Test match career of them all was "enjoyed" by another amateur, Jack MacBryan, whose only game for England was the rain-ruined match against the South Africans in 1924, in which he neither batted nor bowled. Of the professionals, fleeting international careers were enjoyed by the hard-hitting batsman Harold Gimblett, whose entry into first-class cricket was the stuff of legends, and by Arthur Wellard, fast bowler and a mighty smiter of sixes.

Post-Second World War
In postwar cricket, the happy-go-lucky Somerset attitude was no longer sustainable, and the side finished bottom of the Championship for four consecutive seasons from 1952. With the strong possibility of going out of business, drastic change was inevitable. Somerset recruited heavily from other countries, taking Colin McCool and Bill Alley from Australia, and from other counties. In 1958, under the captaincy of the first professional cricketer to captain the team, Maurice Tremlett, the side again finished third, and this was repeated in 1963 and 1966 under different captains, Harold Stephenson and Colin Atkinson, who later became headmaster at Millfield School.

There was a further dip in fortunes towards the end of the 1960s, but, though County Championship success continued to elude the county, Somerset finally found in the 1970s the makings of a successful one-day team under the combative, inspirational captaincy of Yorkshireman Brian Close. A trio of world class players, Viv Richards, Joel 'Big Bird' Garner and the England all-rounder Ian Botham made the team for the first time in its long history a formidable trophy winning proposition.

The real success came after Close had retired. Under the captaincy of left-handed opener Brian Rose, Somerset won their first ever silverware by taking the Gillette Cup and the Sunday League in 1979. In the same 1979 season, Somerset's newfound ruthless streak provoked controversy in the Benson & Hedges Cup limited-overs competition when Rose declared the Somerset innings closed in the match against Worcestershire, in an attempt to safeguard passage through to the quarter-final on run rate: the county was subsequently disqualified from the competition at a special meeting of the Test and County Cricket Board. Rose also captained the side to the Benson & Hedges Cup in 1981 and 1982, and the renamed NatWest Trophy (formerly the Gillette Cup) in 1983. In September 1983, in the NatWest final at Lord's, Somerset beat Kent to win the trophy for the first time in their history.

Controversy returned to Somerset in the mid-1980s. With the successful side ageing, new captain Peter Roebuck led the move to make changes and the overseas stars Viv Richards and Joel Garner were sacked, replaced by the New Zealander Martin Crowe. Ian Botham resigned from Somerset in protest and moved to Worcestershire.

Recent years

Success has been elusive in recent years, although New Zealand born Andy Caddick and opener Marcus Trescothick have proved major pillars of the England Test team and overseas stars such as Jamie Cox have given sterling service for the club, resulting in their appearance in the NatWest Trophy final in 1999 and the C & G Trophy final in 2001 and 2002, winning in 2001 over Leicestershire. In 2001, the team finished second in the first division of the County Championship, its highest-ever placing. But true to its contrary traditions, the county was relegated to the second division at the end of the following season.

Under the guidance of the Director of Cricket Brian Rose, the team has adopted a youth policy, which Rose accepts will lead to a succession of good and bad results in the short term. To balance the youth policy, for two seasons the club was led by high-profile overseas stars Ricky Ponting and Graeme Smith to enable coaching of the young group of players. In July 2005, as perhaps a portent of better times to come, the county was the surprise winner of the third Twenty20 Cup, beating Lancashire in the final at The Oval.

The 2006 season was up and down in results, but in June 2006 Rose announced the signing for six weeks of the Australian cricket team opening batsman Justin Langer, while countryman Dan Cullen was on duty with Australia A. Langer responded by hitting the highest score in the county's first-class history, but without him, the team struggled in both short and long versions of the game, failed to repeat their Twenty20 success and languished at or near the bottom of both County Championship and Pro40 second division tables.

In 2007 Langer, having returned to the team, was named captain. Cameron White was the other overseas player. Somerset's season began brightly, including a county-record 850/7 declared against Middlesex in their first Championship match, but a few weeks later Somerset were on the wrong end of a huge total when they conceded 801/8 declared to Derbyshire. However, they recovered well from this setback and achieved promotion, returning to Division One of the Championship for the first time since 2002, after beating Essex at Chelmsford with five sessions to spare. They were also promoted to Division One of the Pro40 league.

While 2008 was an improved season, 2009 brought marginally less success. Langer announced his retirement from all forms of cricket at the end of the 2009 season, making the 2009 Champions League Twenty20 in India his last competitive competition for the club.

2010–15

On the departure of Justin Langer, Marcus Trescothick was named as club captain for the 2010 season. It was a memorable season for Somerset, although somewhat bitter-sweet. In one of the most successful seasons in the club's history, Somerset finished as runners-up in all major domestic competitions. In August the club went down to Hampshire in the Friends Provident t20 final, after failing to effect a run-out from the last ball that would have secured them the title. In the County Championship, they finished second to Nottinghamshire. While level on points at the close of play on the last day of the Championship season, Nottinghamshire lifted the title by virtue of more wins during the year. They were then beaten by Warwickshire in the Clydesdale Bank 40 final.

In the 2011 season, Somerset again performed well in all three domestic competitions finishing 4th in the County Championship, and runners up again in the Twenty20 competition to Leicestershire and also in the CB40 final to Surrey. Taunton-born keeper-batsman Jos Buttler secured a call up for England for 20/20 cricket. By virtue of finishing runners up in the domestic Twenty20 competition, Somerset qualified for the T20 Champions League competition in India featuring many of the world's best 20/20 teams. Roelof van der Merwe returned as their overseas player for this competition. Somerset performed exceptionally well, progressing from the preliminary round to the semi-final where they lost to the Mumbai Indians, in the process picking up considerable prize money.

During the 2012 season, Somerset were ravaged by injuries to the extent that on two occasions the county were reduced to their last 11 available players, with members of the coaching and support staff having to fill in as 12th men. Despite this it was another successful season with Somerset again finishing runners-up in the Championship, though they finished 24 points behind the winners, only losing one match all year. Nick Compton carried a batting lineup that at times missed key players such as Trescothick and Craig Kieswetter due to injury, averaging an incredible 99.25. In one-day competitions, Somerset couldn't quite make up for a poor start in the CB40, losing their first 4 games, before winning their next 6 completed matches and narrowly missing out on the semi-finals. In the reformatted t20, Somerset topped their group and won the home quarter-final against Essex to send them on another trip to finals day, only to fall short to Hampshire in the semi-final.

In 2013, Somerset took a backward step in the Championship, as the batting lineup largely struggled. A late win over Surrey in September, the side's first and only Championship win at Taunton all year, basically assured them of safety and Somerset ended up in 6th place. Somerset found much better success in the one-day formats, topping their group in the YB40, winning 8 out of their 12 games only to be bowled out for just 119 in the semi-final and lose by 8 wickets. Peter Trego was the tournament's leading run-scorer with 745 including 2 hundreds and 5 fifties in 12 innings. The now familiar pattern of success in the group stages and disappointment in the latter stages was repeated in the t20 as Somerset were knocked out in the quarter-finals by Surrey. Before the season Brian Rose's tenure as Director of Cricket ended and he was replaced by David Nosworthy.

Somerset had an indifferent 2014, as they failed to make much headway in the Championship and, for the first time since 2007, weren't able make the knockout stages of either one-day competition. Somerset again placed 6th in the Championship, although they were in no danger of relegation unlike the previous season. The beginning of the season had seen the departure of crowd favourite Buttler to Lancashire, and towards the end was marred by what turned out to be a career-ending eye injury to Kieswetter.

2015

Before the start of the 2015 season, plenty of changes took place at the club. Matthew Maynard stepped into the role of Director of Cricket after the club parted ways with Nosworthy. With the loss of Kieswetter, Somerset also lost another senior batsman in Compton as he moved back to London. Alfonso Thomas became captain in one-day competitions with Trescothick remaining as club and First-class captain. Somerset also made some new signings, including Chris Gayle for the start of the t20 Blast. For the most part, the season followed much the same path as the last, with Somerset failing to reach the latter stages of either limited overs competition and battling for the lower places in the Championship. Despite Gayle providing 328 runs in his three innings with the club, Somerset languished second from bottom in the t20 Blast. With Thomas sent out on loan, new signing Jim Allenby took over the captaincy for the One-Day Cup and despite winning their last three matches, Somerset missed out on a quarter-final spot. In the Championship Somerset looked to be in relegation trouble for much of the season, but led by a late run of form from Trescothick and thanks to a maximum points victory in their final game, Somerset avoided the drop by a margin of 22 points and finished 6th in Division One for the third consecutive year. James Hildreth was the leading Championship run-scorer in Division One.

2016

The 2016 season saw dramatic improvements in two of the three competitions. Chris Rogers was brought in to captain the Championship side on a one-year basis, and having been mid-table for most of the season, Somerset went on a late surge which put them right in contention for the title going into the last round of matches. Somerset defeated Nottinghamshire in their match, with Rogers scoring tons in both innings of the last game of his career, but needed Middlesex and Yorkshire to draw their match on the final day. With the game drifting, Yorkshire employed declaration bowling in order to allow Middlesex to set a target. However, as the close neared, it became clear that Yorkshire were not going to reach the target and Middlesex appeared not to have quite enough time to bowl Yorkshire out. In heartbreaking fashion, Yorkshire's lower order collapsed to hand Middlesex the title and leave Somerset finishing runners-up. Somerset had four batsmen reach 1000 runs in the Championship, those being Trescothick, Hildreth, Rogers and for the first time in his career, Peter Trego. Spinner Jack Leach claimed 65 wickets, finishing second in the Division One wicket takers list. Somerset enjoyed a good run of success in the One-Day Cup too, reaching the semi-finals before losing to eventual champions Warwickshire. Captain Jim Allenby was the leading run-scorer, passing 50 in five of his ten innings in the competition. Lewis Gregory and Tim Groenewald both performed well enough to qualify for the South team for the inaugural North v South one-day series at the start of the next season. In stark contrast, Somerset's t20 Blast campaign was disastrous, the club finished bottom of the South Group and lost their last seven games in a row.

2017

Before the 2017 season, Somerset announced that at the age of 22, Tom Abell would be appointed as club and Championship captain. Somerset made a disastrous start to the Championship, losing four of their first six games of the season. Despite a victory in the seventh game against Yorkshire at Scarborough, Somerset's prospects of survival looked very poor indeed at the halfway mark of the season. A strong draw against Surrey was followed by victories against Warwickshire and Lancashire, and although Somerset lost their penultimate game against Surrey, their fate was still in their own hands. Somerset needed to beat Middlesex in the final match of the year at Taunton with one more bonus point than their opponents to assure safety. Thanks to a 9-wicket match haul from Jack Leach on a turning pitch, and a century from James Hildreth in the second innings, Somerset comfortably beat Middlesex by 231 runs to condemn last year's champions to relegation, and ensure their 10-year run in Division One would continue for another season. Leach finished with 51 wickets, while Craig Overton's 46 wickets were enough to see him called up for that winter's Ashes tour. As a mark of how the batting unit struggled, overseas player Dean Elgar was the only batsman to average over 36 with the bat, and Elgar was absent from the second half of the season. New signing Steven Davies was the leading run scorer with 775. Somerset again enjoyed good success in the One-Day Cup, winning five of seven completed matches and qualifying second in the South Group for a home quarter-final against Nottinghamshire. Somerset lost an incredible game in which 834 runs were scored, falling short of Nottinghamshire's 429/9 by 24 runs. Elgar also enjoyed great success in this competition, scoring 519 runs in the 6 games he played. Somerset were again involved in a thriller in the final round of games of the t20 Blast, where a 98-run victory against Hampshire saw them through to the quarter-finals by 0.07 on Net run rate for the first time since 2013. Somerset faced a difficult trip to Trent Bridge, and lost to Nottinghamshire by 5 wickets. At the end of the year it was announced that both one-day captain Jim Allenby and Director of Cricket Matthew Maynard would not be returning for 2018.

2018

Under new director of cricket Andy Hurry, who returned to the club, and new head coach Jason Kerr, Somerset enjoyed an excellent start to their 2018 Championship campaign, winning three of their first five matches whilst drawing the other two. However, a heavy innings defeat to Surrey in the next round proved to be pivotal, as Surrey would go on to run away with the Championship title winning 10 of their 14 matches. Nonetheless, Somerset themselves won 7 games and only lost twice, but were consigned to yet another runners-up finish. James Hildreth broke the 1000 run barrier, whilst Lewis Gregory and Craig Overton finished with 37 wickets each. Somerset struggled to find consistency in their One-Day Cup campaign, but nevertheless entered the final round of matches with a chance to qualify for a playoff. Despite winning their final game against eventual champions Hampshire, Essex secured the win they needed to reach the playoffs in place of Somerset. The 2018 season saw Somerset take a further step forward in their t20 cricket under new t20 captain Gregory, as they reached finals day for the first time in 6 years. Despite losing two of their first three games, Somerset ended up finishing top of the South Group, winning 10 of their 14 matches to earn a home quarter-final and a chance to exact revenge for the previous year on Nottinghamshire. They were able do so, winning by 19 runs on a reserve day due to the weather, sending them to finals day. There Somerset lost out to Sussex in the semi-final by 35 runs as Sussex were able to put a sizeable score of 202 on the board. The improved performance in the competition was in no small part due to the impact of overseas signings Corey Anderson, who was the team's leading run-scorer with 514 runs at a strike-rate of 169.1, and Jerome Taylor who claimed 22 wickets in his 11 matches. Jamie Overton was Somerset's leading wicket-taker with 24 in his 16 games.

2019

2019 was to prove to be the year Somerset finally broke their 14-year trophy drought, as they claimed victory in the 2019 Royal London One-Day Cup, to end a run of 10 runners-up finishes across all formats over a 10-year span. The campaign began in brilliant style as Somerset secured their largest-ever List A margin of victory by beating Kent by 264 runs in their opening match. Victories in their next three games including a win against Essex in the first-ever game played under the new permanent floodlights at the County Ground, meant at the halfway stage in the competition, qualification to the knockout stages seemed assured. However, defeats in their next three including a resounding loss to Hampshire, who chased a target of 216 in the 32nd over, left Somerset needing a win in their final game just to make it into an away play-off game. They were able to defeat Surrey by 5 wickets, setting up a play-off game against Worcestershire at New Road. A century from Tom Banton, and a five-wicket haul from overseas player Azhar Ali saw Somerset to a comfortable win by 147 runs. In the semi-final, Somerset once again faced Nottinghamshire in a knockout game, at Trent Bridge. Somerset posted exactly the same score of 337 as they had in the play-off match, and the total once again proved to be more than enough, as Nottinghamshire were bowled out for 222, meaning Somerset reached the Lord's final where they would face defending champions Hampshire. Hampshire won the toss and chose to bat but Somerset, thanks mainly to the opening spell of Josh Davey and eventual man-of-the-match Jamie Overton in the middle overs, were able to take wickets at regular intervals, and despite a ninth-wicket stand of 64, Hampshire's total of 244/8 looked to be short of what would be required. This proved to be even more the case when Banton and Azhar Ali put on an opening partnership of 112, and despite losing both in quick succession, Somerset always looked in control. Fittingly the winning runs were scored by James Hildreth, who had also hit the winning runs as a 20-year-old in Somerset's last trophy win in 2005.

Ground history

Players

Current squad
 No. denotes the player's squad number, as worn on the back of their shirt.
  denotes players with international caps.
  denotes a player who has been awarded a county cap.

Former players

Captains

Club officials

Committee
 President: Peter Wanless
 Chairman: Michael Barber
 Honorary Treasurer: Nick Farrant
 Chief Executive: Gordon Hollins
 Directors: Vic Marks, Rowena Sellens, Rachel Baillache, Nathan Goddard
 Members Directors: Richard Brice, Geoff, Vian, Christine Brewer
 Somerset Cricket Foundation Representative: Dr Habib Naqvi

Coaching staff
 Director of Cricket: Andrew Hurry
 Head coach: Jason Kerr
 Assistant coach: Shane Burger
 Batting coach: Shane Burger
 Bowling coach: Vacant
 Fielding coach: Paul Tweddle
 Second XI coach: Gregor Kennis
 Head of Talent Pathway: Matt Drakeley

Administration and coaching history

Presidents
Those who have held the office of Somerset President are:

See also
 List of Somerset first-class cricket records
 List of Somerset List A cricket records
 List of Somerset Twenty20 cricket records

Notes

References

Bibliography

Further reading
H S Altham, A History of Cricket, Volume 1 (to 1914), George Allen & Unwin, 1962
Derek Birley, A Social History of English Cricket, Aurum, 1999
Rowland Bowen, Cricket: A History of its Growth and Development, Eyre & Spottiswoode, 1970
Roy Webber, The Playfair Book of Cricket Records, Playfair Books, 1951
Playfair Cricket Annual – various editions
Wisden Cricketers' Almanack – various editions

External links
Somerset CCC Official Site
Somerset First-Class Records at cricketarchive.com

 
Sport in Taunton
English first-class cricket teams
History of Somerset
Cricket in Somerset
Cricket clubs established in 1875
1875 establishments in England